was a Japanese literary magazine active from 1908 to 1997.

History and profile
Araragi was established by Itō Sachio in 1908. He was also the editor of the magazine until his death in 1913. Shimagi Akahiko was the next editor of the magazine.

it was a leading magazine of tanka (short poems). A group of poets who contributed to the magazine has come to be known as the Araragi school.

In the postwar period, Araragi continued to publish, and was shut down in December 1997.

Contributors 
 Mokichi Saito
 Sachio Ito

References

1908 establishments in Japan
1997 disestablishments in Japan
Defunct literary magazines published in Japan
Empire of Japan
Magazines established in 1908
Magazines disestablished in 1997
Poetry literary magazines